Urad Middle Banner (Mongolian:    Урад-ун Думдаду Қосиу Urad-un Dumdadu Qosiɣu) is a banner of the Inner Mongolia Autonomous Region, People's Republic of China. It is located in the west of the region, and administratively is part of Bayan Nur City.

Climate
Urad Middle Banner has a monsoon-influenced, continental semi-arid climate (Köppen BSk), barely avoiding arid designation, with very cold and dry winters, hot, somewhat humid summers, and strong winds, especially in spring. With monthly percent possible sunshine ranging from 65% in July to 76% in October, sunshine is abundant year-round, and there are 3,164 hours of bright sunshine annually.

References

External links

Banners of Inner Mongolia
Bayannur